Harrison Township is one of four townships in Blackford County, Indiana. As of the 2010 census, its population was 2,640 and it contained 1,196 housing units. The township was named after William Henry Harrison, hero of the Battle of Tippecanoe, former governor of the Indiana Territory, and ninth President of the United States.

Geography
Lake Blue Water and the Godfrey Reserve are in this township. The Salamonie River runs through the township's northeast corner.

Cities and towns
 Montpelier

Unincorporated towns
 Dorsey's Station (ghost town)
 Matamoras
 Mollie (ghost town)
 Pleasantdale (ghost town)

Major highways

Cemeteries
The township contains at least eight cemeteries: Brookside, Independent Order of Odd Fellows, North Twibell, Penrod, Pleasantdale, South Twibell, St Margaret's Roman Catholic, and Woodlawn.

Notes

References
 

U.S. Board on Geographic Names
 United States Census Bureau cartographic boundary files

External links

 Indiana Township Association
 United Township Association of Indiana

Townships in Blackford County, Indiana
Townships in Indiana